The 1928 Detroit Titans football team represented the University of Detroit in the 1928 college football season. Detroit shut out seven of its nine opponents, outscored opponents by a combined total of 267 to 27, and finished with a perfect 9–0 record in their fourth year under head coach and College Football Hall of Fame inductee, Gus Dorais. The team has been recognized as a co-national champion of 1928 by Parke H. Davis. Significant games included victories over Tulsa (19–14), Louisville (46–0), Michigan State (39–0), and Fordham (19–0).

The team was led by halfback Lloyd Brazil who was selected by Grantland Rice as the first-team utility back on the 1928 College Football All-America Team. During the 1928 season, Brazil set a new NCAA major college record with 997 passing yards. In 1929, he led the NCAA major colleges with 1,117 rushing yards and also led in total offense.

Schedule

Season summary

DePaul
On September 29, 1928, the Titans opened their season by defeating DePaul, 39–0, at Dinan Field in Detroit.

at Tulsa
On October 6, 1928, the Titans defeated Tulsa, 19–14, in 90 degree heat with high humidity in Tulsa, Oklahoma.

Louisville
On October 13, 1928, the Titans defeated Louisville, 46–0, at Dinan Field.

Loyola
On October 20, 1928, the Titans defeated the Loyola Wolf Pack, 27–0, at Dinan Field.

at Dayton
On October 27, 1928, the Titans defeated Dayton, 7–0, in a game played in Dayton, Ohio.  Tom Connell scored the game's only touchdown in the first quarter.

St. Louis
On November 3, 1928, the Titans defeated Saint Louis, 38–0, at Dinan Field.

Michigan State
On November 10, 1928, the Titans defeated Harry Kipke's Michigan State Spartans, 39–0, at Dinan Field in Detroit. Lloyd Brazil scored two touchdowns in the game.

at Fordham
On November 17, 1928, the Titans defeated Fordham, 19–0, before a small crowd at the Polo Grounds in New York City. Tom Connell scored three touchdowns and kicked an extra point, accounting for all 19 Detroit points.

Georgetown
On December 1, 1928, the Titans defeated Georgetown, 33–13, before a record crowd of 30,000 at Dinan Field in Detroit. The victor capped an undefeated season.  The Detroit players carried Lloyd Brazil and Tom Connell off the field in celebration of the victory.

Players

Line

Backfield

References

External links
 Video of 1928 Detroit Titans team banquet

Detroit
Detroit Titans football seasons
College football national champions
College football undefeated seasons
Detroit Titans football
Detroit Titans football